Alan Ackroyd (27 December 1948), also known by the nickname of "Bunny", is an English former professional rugby league footballer who played in the 1960s, 1970s and 1980s.

Background
Alan Ackroyd was born in Kippax, West Riding of Yorkshire, England. He now lives in Normanton, West Yorkshire.

Playing career
During his time at Castleford he scored one 2-point drop goal.

County Cup Final appearances
Alan Ackroyd played as an interchange/substitute, i.e. number 15, (replacing  Ian Van Bellen) and scored a 2-goals  in Castleford's 7-11 defeat by Hull Kingston Rovers in the 1971 Yorkshire County Cup Final during the 1971–72 season at Belle Vue, Wakefield on Saturday 21 August 1971.

References

External links
Alan Ackroyd Memory Box Search at archive.castigersheritage.com

1948 births
Living people
Bramley RLFC players
Castleford Tigers players
English rugby league players
Halifax R.L.F.C. players
People from Kippax, West Yorkshire
Rugby league players from Leeds
Rugby league props